Deputy Prime Minister of Greenland is a position, held by one government minister, in the Government of Greenland who can take the position of acting Prime Minister when the Prime minister is temporarily absent. The job is unofficial, but in many media, the person taking over when the Prime Minister is absent, is often dubbed Deputy Prime Minister, or Naalakkersuisut siulittaasuata tullia in Greenlandic.

In case of coalition governments, the position is usually held by the leader of the second largest party in the cabinet. The Deputy Prime Minister is also the highest ranking minister after the Prime Minister.

Since 10 December 2014, the position is held by Andreas Uldum. Uldum is leader of the Democrats (Greenland), and Minister for Finances and Mineral Resources.

List of deputy prime ministers

References

Politics of Greenland